= Long stop =

Long stop can refer to:

- In phonology, a type of stop consonant
- In cricket, a largely obsolete fielding position behind the wicketkeeper
